North Wexford was a United Kingdom Parliament constituency in Ireland, returning one Member of Parliament from 1885 to 1922.

Prior to 1885 the area was part of the County Wexford constituency. After 1922 the area was not represented in the UK Parliament.

Boundaries
This constituency comprised the northern part of County Wexford.

1885–1922: The baronies of Ballaghkeen North, Ballaghkeen South, Gorey, Scarawalsh and Shelmaliere East, that part of the barony of Bantry contained within the parishes of Chapel, Clonleigh, Clonmore, Killann, Killegny, Rossdroit, St. John's, St. Mullin's, Templeludigan and Templescoby, and that part of the barony of Shelmaliere West contained within the parish of Clonmore.

Members of Parliament

Elections

Elections in the 1880s

Elections in the 1890s

Elections in the 1900s

Elections in the 1910s

References

The Parliaments of England by Henry Stooks Smith (1st edition published in three volumes 1844–50), 2nd edition edited (in one volume) by F.W.S. Craig (Political Reference Publications 1973)

Westminster constituencies in County Wexford (historic)
Dáil constituencies in the Republic of Ireland (historic)
Constituencies of the Parliament of the United Kingdom established in 1885
Constituencies of the Parliament of the United Kingdom disestablished in 1922